Mario A. Beaulieu  (born February 1, 1959) is a Canadian politician. An advocate for nationalism in Quebec, he served as leader (2014–2015), interim leader (2018–2019) and president (2014–2018) of the Bloc Québécois (BQ); Beaulieu has been the Member of Parliament (MP) for La Pointe-de-l'Île since the 2015 election.

He was the 80th president of the sovereignist Société Saint-Jean-Baptiste of Montreal from 2009 to 2014 and has been a spokesman for the Mouvement Québec français, a coalition of organizations in favour of the preservation and defence of the French language in Quebec.

Early life and career
Mario Beaulieu was born on February 1, 1959, in Sherbrooke; at age four, his family moved to Sainte-Anne-de-Bellevue.

Bealieu was the president of the Parti Québécois's riding association in Montreal Centre from 1997 to 2002 and was an unsuccessful Bloc Québécois candidate in the 1997 federal election, losing to federal cabinet minister Pierre Pettigrew in Papineau—Saint-Denis. He has been a long-time advocate for strengthening measures requiring the predominance of the French language in Quebec, as well as for Quebec independence.

Bloc Québécois leader
In April 2014, he declared his candidacy for the leadership of the Bloc Québécois and received the endorsement of the executive of the Bloc's youth wing, former Parti Québécois legislative members Bernard Landry and Pierre Curzi, and the former president of the Mouvement Desjardins, Claude Béland.  Beaulieu, viewed as a "hardline" sovereigntist, promised to prioritize achieving Quebec independence above everything else. On June 14, 2014, he defeated BQ Member of Parliament André Bellavance for the Bloc leadership with 53.5% of the vote. Beaulieu took office as Bloc leader at the party's convention on June 25, 2014.

Shortly after his election, Beaulieu attracted controversy from within the party due to statements in his acceptance speech associated with the Front de libération du Québec and separate statements seemingly critical about the past leaders of the party, which drew criticism from former Bloc Québécois leader Gilles Duceppe and resulted in two party members announcing their intentions to leave the party. In the weeks following his election, a number of riding executive members quit the party to protest Beaulieu's leadership and a number of individuals who had been considering running for the party in the next election removed themselves from consideration. On August 12, 2014, the party's parliamentary caucus was reduced to 3 MPs after House Leader Jean-François Fortin quit the party to sit as an Independent MP. Fortin accused Beaulieu of "pushing a unidimensional, intransigent agenda that lacks rigour has put an end to the credibility established by (former leaders) Gilles Duceppe and followed up by Daniel Paillé, two leaders who merit great respect." On August 25, 2014, André Bellavance, who had lost to Beaulieu in the leadership vote also resigned, reducing the Bloc to two MPs.  Bellavance told a press conference, in regards to Beaulieu: "His vision and orientation for the Bloc are diametrically opposed to mine. Mr. Beaulieu says he can unite the party; for me it’s not the case."

Return of Duceppe
With the party languishing as it was about to enter the 2015 federal election, Beaulieu entered into discussions with former party leader Gilles Duceppe in hopes of saving the Bloc from extinction. On June 10, 2015, Beaulieu and Duceppe jointly announced that Gilles Duceppe would be returning to lead the party into the election campaign while Beaulieu would relinquish the leadership but remain party president. The party executive agreed on June 9, 2015, to split the positions of president and party leader in order to facilitate Duceppe's return. The changes were ratified by the party's general council on July 1.

2015 election
In the 2015 election, Beaulieu was elected in the riding of La Pointe-de-l'Île, the only Bloc MP elected on the island of Montreal. The party returned 10 MPs, but fell short of official party status.

Return to Bloc Québécois leadership
Beaulieu was one of three Bloc MPs who initially supported Martine Ouellet's leadership during a caucus revolt and remained with the Bloc caucus when seven MPs resigned on February 28, 2018, to sit as Independents. He later became critical of her leadership and campaigned for her removal for an upcoming leadership review, whilst staying in caucus. Beaulieu was named interim leader after Ouellet resigned over losing a party referendum on her leadership.

On August 22, 2018, he ceded the party presidency to Yves Perron as part of an agreement to reunite the party following the conflict over Martine Oulette's leadership. Beaulieu is to continue as interim leader, however, until a leadership election is held in 2019. On January 17, 2019, he was succeeded as party leader by Yves-François Blanchet.

Electoral record

References

External links

Living people
Politicians from Sherbrooke
People from Sainte-Anne-de-Bellevue, Quebec
Bloc Québécois leaders
Canadian federal political party presidents
Parti Québécois politicians
Bloc Québécois MPs
Members of the House of Commons of Canada from Quebec
1959 births
French Quebecers
21st-century Canadian politicians